Andarman (also Romanized as Andarmān and Andarmūn; also known as Andarhān) is a village in Azimiyeh Rural District, in the Central District of Ray County, Tehran Province, Iran. At the 2006 census, its population was 424, in 115 families.

References 

Populated places in Ray County, Iran